Yasemin Güler (born April 10, 1994) is a Turkish women's handballer, who plays in the Turkish Women's Handball Super League for Kastamonu Bld. GSK, and the Turkey national team. The -tall sportswoman plays in the right wing position.

Playing career

Club
Güler plays for her hometown club İzmir Büyükşehir Belediyesi SK in the Turkish Women's Handball Super League. She took part at the EHF Cup Winners' Cup (2011–12 and 2012–13) as well as at the Women's EHF Challenge Cup (2014–15 and 2015–16).

International
Güler played in 2014 for the Turkey women's U-20 team. Later, she was admitted to the Turkey women's national handball team. She took part at the 
European Women's Handball Championship qualification matches for 2014, and 2016.

References 

1994 births
People from Konak
Sportspeople from İzmir
Turkish female handball players
İzmir Büyükşehir Belediyespor handball players
Turkey women's national handball players
Living people
Competitors at the 2018 Mediterranean Games
Mediterranean Games competitors for Turkey
20th-century Turkish sportswomen
21st-century Turkish sportswomen